Charmstone is a stone pendant sculpture by Michael Heizer, installed outside the main entrance of the Menil Collection in Houston, Texas, United States.

See also

 List of public art in Houston

References

Outdoor sculptures in Houston
Stone sculptures in Texas
Neartown, Houston